Sharon Township is one of the seventeen  townships of Medina County, Ohio, United States.  The 2000 census found 4,244 people in the township.

Geography
Located in the east part of the county, it borders the following townships and city:
Granger Township - north
Bath Township, Summit County - northeast corner
Copley Township, Summit County - east
Norton - southeast corner
Wadsworth Township - south
Guilford Township - southwest corner
Montville Township - west
Medina Township - northwest corner

A small part of the city of Wadsworth is located in southern Sharon Township.

Name and history
Statewide, other Sharon Townships are located in Franklin, Noble, and Richland counties.

Government
The township is governed by a three-member board of trustees, who are elected in November of odd-numbered years to a four-year term beginning on the following January 1. Two are elected in the year after the presidential election and one is elected in the year before it. There is also an elected township fiscal officer, who serves a four-year term beginning on April 1 of the year after the election, which is held in November of the year before the presidential election. Vacancies in the fiscal officership or on the board of trustees are filled by the remaining trustees.

Public services
Public safety in Sharon Township is the responsibility of the Medina County Sheriff's Office and the Sharon Township Fire Department.

Addresses in Sharon Township are served by either the Wadsworth city post office or the Medina city post office.

References

External links
County website

Townships in Medina County, Ohio
Townships in Ohio